The Dublin Bay Prawns Lacrosse Club is a former Lacrosse club based in Dublin, Ireland. Formed in 2009, they went on to be crowned champions of the Irish Lacrosse League (ILL) in 2011 and 2012. The club has since been in disbanded in 2017 and has been replaced by a new club, the Dublin Foxes Lacrosse Club. The Dublin Foxes have been officially formed in 2019 and can be contacted through Instagram.

References

Sports clubs in County Dublin
Lacrosse teams in Europe
Lacrosse in Ireland
2009 establishments in Ireland
Lacrosse clubs established in 2009
Sports clubs disestablished in 2017
2017 disestablishments in Ireland